KQRB (96.9 MHz) is an FM radio station licensed to Effingham, Kansas, and serves the Topeka and Lawrence areas of Northeast Kansas. The station is owned by Intrepid Companies, LLC. The station's studios are located on Southwest 29th Street in Topeka, while its transmitter is located near Hoyt.

History
The station, originally KDVB, was formerly owned and operated by Cumulus Media, who won the station's license in a U.S. Federal Communications Commission (FCC) auction in 2004 where it was originally to operate on 96.7 FM in Humboldt, Nebraska. Cumulus applied to move it to Effingham as a Class C2 in 2007, but only built it out as a low-powered Class A once Cumulus canceled its plans to move KMAJ-FM into the Kansas City market (as Cumulus acquired Susquehanna Broadcasting the year prior), preventing the company from fitting KDVB within the ownership limits in its Topeka cluster. During its time under Cumulus ownership, KDVB operated as a repeater of KDVV. Cumulus had obtained a construction permit from the FCC for a power increase to 8,100 watts effective radiated power. The permit expired on January 11, 2013. A new application was filed that day. 

On September 30, 2021, Cumulus Media sold KDVB for $300,000 to Intrepid Companies, which is managed by Don Sherman, previously the owner of KSJM in the Wichita market. Nine days later, KDVB went silent. Intrepid filed an application with the Federal Communications Commission to move the station's transmitter to a site near Hoyt, re-classify the station as a Class C2, and upgrade the station's power to 50,000 watts. The application was approved on April 25, 2022. On June 26, radio news website RadioInsight disclosed that Intrepid had applied to change the station's callsign to KQRB. The change took effect on June 28. On July 11, the station, now with the KQRB call letters, returned to the air and began stunting with a broad mix of music and construction sounds ahead of a new format set to launch on July 14 at noon. At that time, KQRB debuted an urban format consisting of a mix of hip-hop, R&B, and old school music branded as "96.9 The Beat", which launched with 1,969 songs commercial free, with "In the Stone" by Earth, Wind & Fire being the first song played. The station will feature the syndicated DeDe in the Morning and Sunday Night Slow Jams with R. Dub.

References

External links

QRB
Radio stations established in 2008
2008 establishments in Kansas
Urban contemporary radio stations in the United States